Stefano Bruzzi (1 May 1835 – 1911)  was an Italian painter, mainly of landscapes, with children and animals, in a style that recalls Filippo Palizzi.

Life
Born in Emilia, he initially studied in Piacenza under professor Bernardino Massari. At the age of 19 years, he was sent by his father to study in Rome for four years, becoming a follower of professor Castelli. For the marchese Filippo Anguissola of Piacenza he painted: Returning from a hunt near Porto d'Anzio. He lived for some years in Piacenza, painting in the surrounding countryside; from there he moved to Bologna, and finally settled in Florence.

At the first national exposition of Parma he was awarded a silver medal. Among his other works are: Il Passo difficile; Il Viatico; La Carbonaia; Una predica sugli Appennini; La Fiera; L'Autunno; La Benedizione alle Bestie; and Il Precipizio e parecchie vedute dell' Appennino.

References

Further reading 

 

1835 births
1911 deaths
People from Piacenza
19th-century Italian painters
Italian male painters
20th-century Italian painters
Italian landscape painters
19th-century Italian male artists
20th-century Italian male artists